Oliver Miller Homestead, site of the James Miller House, is a public museum that commemorates pioneer settlers of Western Pennsylvania.

The house was built on the site of the Oliver Miller Homestead, which was first settled in 1772. In 1794, the first gunshots of the Whiskey Rebellion were fired on the property. In 1830, the original log house was replaced with a large stone section, making it the "Stone Manse" house as it stands today. It was added to the National Register of Historic Places in 1975, and is a stop on the American Whiskey Trail.

See also
National Register of Historic Places listings in Allegheny County, Pennsylvania

References
 Baldwin, Leland. Whiskey Rebels: The Story of a Frontier Uprising. Pittsburgh: University of Pittsburgh Press, 1939.
 Cooke, Jacob E. "The Whiskey Insurrection: A Re-Evaluation." Pennsylvania History, 30, July 1963, pp. 316–364.

External links
 Museum Website
  
 "Which Oliver Miller?, Western Pennsylvania History Magazine, Home > Pittsburgh History, Volume 75, Number 4, Winter 1992-1993 by Norma Hartman

Houses completed in 1808
Houses completed in 1830
Houses on the National Register of Historic Places in Pennsylvania
Museums in Allegheny County, Pennsylvania
Historic house museums in Pennsylvania
Houses in Allegheny County, Pennsylvania
Pittsburgh History & Landmarks Foundation Historic Landmarks
Historic American Buildings Survey in Pennsylvania
1830 establishments in Pennsylvania
National Register of Historic Places in Allegheny County, Pennsylvania
Whiskey Rebellion